Van Duijn,  Van Duin, and Van (der) Duyn are Dutch toponymic surnames, meaning "from the dune". People with this surname include:

André van Duin (born 1947), Dutch comedian and actor
Faith Van Duin (born 1986), New Zealand mixed martial artist
Jaap van Duijn (born 1990), Dutch footballer
Karl van Duyn Teeter (1929–2007), American linguist
Marco van Duin (born 1987), Dutch footballer
Mona Van Duyn (1921–2004), American poet
Roel van Duijn (born 1943), Dutch politician, political activist and writer
Terry Van Duyn, North Carolina senator
 a Dutch noble family, including
Frans Adam van der Duyn van Maasdam (1771–1848), Dutch officer and politician
Susanna Maria van der Duyn (1698–1780), Dutch actress

Dutch-language surnames
Surnames of Dutch origin